Walbeck may refer to the following places in Germany:

Walbeck, Börde, a municipality in the Börde district, Saxony-Anhalt
Walbeck, Mansfeld-Südharz, a municipality in the Mansfeld-Südharz district, Saxony-Anhalt
Walbeck (Geldern), a village in the municipality Geldern, North Rhine-Westphalia

See also 
Counts of Walbeck